Rondania dimidiata is a species of bristle fly in the family Tachinidae. It is found in Europe, Alaska, Yukon Territory, and the Northwest Territories.

References

Dexiinae
Insects described in 1824
Taxa named by Johann Wilhelm Meigen
Diptera of Europe